Saint Barnabas was an early Christian mentioned in the New Testament.

Saint Barnabas may also refer to:

 St. Barnabas' Church, the name of several churches
 St Barnabas College, the name of several colleges
 St Barnabas Hospital (disambiguation)
 Saint Barnabas Medical Center, in Livingston, New Jersey, U.S.
 St. Barnabas Road, part of Maryland Route 414, U.S.
 St. Barnabas GAC, a Gaelic sports club in Nottingham, England
 St Barnabas (Madzimbabwe) Secondary School, Zimbabwe

See also 

 Barnabas (disambiguation)
 San Barnaba (disambiguation)
 Nottingham Cathedral, the Cathedral Church of St. Barnabas, Nottingham, England